Liss Athletic F.C. is an amateur football club based in Liss, near Petersfield, in England.

History
Liss Athletic Football Club was established in 1962. The club joined Division Four of the Hampshire League for the start of the 1975–76 campaign, and were immediately promoted to Division Three when they finished third.

Further promotion followed in the 1979–80 season, when the top two teams expanded and Liss were placed in Division Two, where the club remained for three seasons before leaving the Hampshire League at the end of 1982–83.

The club returned to the Hampshire League for the 1987–88 season, placed into Division Two, where they remained until 1994–95, promoted to Division One as champions.

Liss remained in the top tier of the Hampshire League until the end of the 2003–04 campaign, after which they joined the newly created Division Two of the Wessex League, which then became Division One after two seasons, until the end of the 2007–08 campaign.

Liss joined the newly formed Hampshire Premier League - which had been founded a season earlier, and were twice reprieved from relegation in finished bottom of the table in consecutive seasons of 2010-11 and 11-12 - with the club's best finish in recent years in 2016–17, when they finished fourth.

After two abandoned seasons because of the covid pandemic, 2021-22 saw a new-look Liss Athletic finish just above the relegation spots under manager, Mark Glazier, with opportunity handed to a number of progressing youth team players, where the club operates a side at every age group as part of its growing set-up.

The club also runs a reserve side who participate in the Hampshire Combination & Development League - East Division.

Ground
Liss Athletic play their home games at Newman Collard Playing Fields, Hill Brow Road, Liss, Hampshire, GU33 7LH.

Honours
Hampshire League Division Two:
 Champions (1): 1994–95

Records
'Highest league position: 5th in Wessex League Division Two 2005–06
Record victory: 9–4 v Paulsgrove, February 2010
Record defeat: 2-14 v Colden Common, September 2019
Record attendance: 140 v Whitehill and Bordon, August 2022

References

External links
Club website
Liss Athletic - Football Club History Database

Football clubs in Hampshire
Association football clubs established in 1962
Football clubs in England
1962 establishments in England
Hampshire League
Wessex Football League
Hampshire Premier League